Women's 57 kg competition at the Taekwondo at the 2015 European Games in Baku, Azerbaijan, took place on 17 June at Crystal Hall complex.

Schedule
All times are Azerbaijan Summer Time (UTC+5).

Results 
Legend
R — Won by referee stop contest
W — Won by withdrawal

Repechage

References

External links

Taekwondo at the 2015 European Games
Euro